Aon Abbas is a Pakistani politician who is serving as a member of the Senate of Pakistan from the Punjab Province since March 2021 and Special Assistant to Prime Minister on E-commerce from November 2021 till April 2022. He belongs to Pakistan Tehreek-e-Insaf.

References

Living people
Pakistani Senators 2021–2027
Pakistan Tehreek-e-Insaf politicians
Year of birth missing (living people)